Ocotea puberula is a species of evergreen tree in the plant genus Ocotea of the family Lauraceae. It is found in Argentina, Brazil, French Guiana, Guyana, Mexico, Peru, and Suriname.

References

puberula
Flora of Argentina
Flora of Brazil
Flora of French Guiana
Flora of Guyana
Trees of Mexico
Flora of Peru
Flora of Suriname
Least concern plants
Least concern flora of North America
Least concern biota of South America
Taxonomy articles created by Polbot
Cloud forest flora of Mexico